Brian Clark was a New Zealand rugby league footballer who represented New Zealand in 1969.

Playing career
Clark played in the Auckland Rugby League competition for the Ellerslie Eagles. In 1969 Clark was selected in the New Zealand side that played two tests against Australia.

References

Possibly living people
New Zealand rugby league players
New Zealand national rugby league team players
Ellerslie Eagles players
Rugby league centres
Year of birth missing
Place of birth missing